The Order of the Arrow (OA) is the honor society of the Boy Scouts of America (BSA), composed of Scouts and Scouters who best exemplify the Scout Oath and Law in their daily lives as elected by their peers. The society was created by E. Urner Goodman, with the assistance of Carroll A. Edson, in 1915 as a means of reinforcing the Scout Oath and the Scout Law. It uses imagery commonly associated with American Indian cultures for its self-invented ceremonies. These ceremonies are usually for recognition of leadership qualities, camping skills, and other scouting ideals as exemplified by their elected peers.

Influenced by Scout camp customs, the OA uses "safeguarded" (privy only to members) symbols, handshakes, and private rituals to impart a sense of community. Native Americans have criticized the OA's various symbols and "rituals" as cultural appropriation based on non-Native stereotypes of American Indians.

Inducted members, known as Arrowmen or Brothers (regardless of gender; as BSA and its programs are open to all genders), are organized into local youth-led lodges that harbor fellowship, promote camping, and render service to Boy Scout councils and their communities. Each lodge corresponds to a BSA council in the area. Lodges are further broken down into chapters, which correspond to a district in scouting. Members wear identifying insignia on their uniforms, most notably the OA pocket flap that represents their individual OA lodge and the OA sash worn at official OA functions. The OA program sponsors several events, awards, and training functions.

History

Founding and development

In 1915, E. Urner Goodman, a newly hired field executive for the Philadelphia Council, was assigned to serve as director of the council's summer camp at Treasure Island Scout Reservation on the Delaware River. He believed that the summer camp experience should do more than just teach proficiency in Scoutcraft skills; rather, the principles embodied in the Scout Oath and Scout Law should become realities in the lives of Scouts. Along with his assistant camp director, Carroll A. Edson, he started an experimental honor society to acknowledge those campers he felt best exemplified these qualities, calling the program, Wimachtendienk, or "Brotherhood" in one of the Lenape dialects. The full original name for the organization was Wimachtendienk Wingolauchsik Witahemui (Brotherhood of Those Who Serve Cheerfully). It is still referred to via the inclusion of the letters "W W W" on most lodge patches.

Goodman and Edson decided that a "camp fraternity" was the way to improve the summer camp experience and to encourage older Scouts to continue attending Scout summer camp. In developing this program they borrowed from the traditions and practices of several other organizations. Edward Cave's Boy's Camp Book (1914) was consulted for the concept of a camp society that would perpetuate camp traditions. College fraternities were also influential for their concepts of brotherhood and rituals, and the idea of new members pledging themselves to the new organization. Inspired by Ernest Thompson Seton's previous Woodcraft Indians program, American Indian motifs were used to make the organization interesting and appealing to youth. Other influences include the Brotherhood of Andrew and Phillip, a Presbyterian church youth group with which Goodman had been involved as a young man, and Freemasonry.

The traditions and rituals of Freemasonry contributed more to the basic structure of the OA ritual than any other organization. In fact, there appears to be no known fraternal organization more faithful in form to Freemasonry than the OA. Familiar terms such as "lodge" and "obligation" were borrowed from Masonic practice, as were most of the ceremonial structures and ritual formulae. Even the early national meeting was called a "Grand Lodge," a Masonic reference.

Goodman and Edson ultimately devised a program where troops chose, at the summer camp's conclusion, those boys from among their number who they felt best exemplified the ideals of Scouting. Those elected were acknowledged as having displayed, in the eyes of their fellow Scouts, a spirit of unselfish service and brotherhood. Edson and Goodman said they "based the OA's lore and ceremonies on the lore of the Lenni Lenape Indians who had occupied Treasure Island in earlier times" and based the group's structure "on a loose interpretation of Hiawatha and Last of the Mohicans", both popular works of fiction by Henry Wadsworth Longfellow and James Fenimore Cooper, respectively. The Scouts considered this move a success, and went on to repeat this pattern the following summer at Treasure Island. Those Scouts honored at Treasure Island in 1915 and 1916 would become members of what is now Unami Lodge.

By 1921, Goodman had spoken to Scout leaders in surrounding states about their honor society, which resulted in multiple lodges being established by Scout councils in the northeastern United States. The name of the society was then changed to Order of the Arrow, and in October 1921, Goodman convened the first national meeting of what at that time was called the "National Lodge of the Order of the Arrow" in Philadelphia—where Goodman was elected as Grand Chieftain. Committees were organized to formulate a constitution, refine ceremonial rituals, devise insignia, and plan future development.

In the early 1920s, many Scout executives were skeptical of what they called "secret camp fraternities." By September 1922, opposition to the Order of the Arrow was such that a formal resolution opposing "camp fraternities" was proposed at a national meeting of Scout executives. Goodman argued against the motion: "Using the Scout ideals as our great objective", he said, a camp activity that will "further the advancement of those ideals" should not be suppressed. The motion was narrowly defeated, and the fledgling Order continued as an experimental program throughout the 1920s and 1930s. In 1931, there were OA lodges in 7 percent of BSA councils nationwide. By 1948, about two-thirds of the BSA's councils had established OA lodges. That year, the OA was also integrated as an official part of the Scouting program.

21st century

Over the century since the Order of the Arrow's founding, more than one million Scouts and Scouters have worn the OA sash on their uniforms, denoting membership in the Brotherhood. The four stated purposes of the Order of the Arrow are: "(1) Recognize those who best exemplify the Scout Oath and Law in their daily lives and through that recognition cause others to conduct themselves in a way that warrants similar recognition; (2) Promote camping, responsible outdoor adventure, and environmental stewardship as essential components of every Scout’s experience, in the unit, year-round, and in summer camp; (3) Develop leaders with the willingness, character, spirit and ability to advance the activities of their units, our Brotherhood, Scouting, and ultimately our nation; and (4) Crystallize the Scout habit of helpfulness into a life purpose of leadership in cheerful service to
others.

In a new program of national service conducted from June through August 2008, the OA offered ArrowCorps5 to both youth and adult Arrowmen. Described as "one of the largest conservation efforts in Scouting's history" by the Boy Scouts of America, approximately 3,500 Arrowmen converged on five national forests to work on various conservation projects such as building new trails and helping preserve nearly extinct species, as well as removing invasive species, in cooperation with the U.S. Forest Service. The five national forests are: Mark Twain National Forest, Manti-La Sal National Forest, George Washington and Jefferson National Forests, Shasta-Trinity National Forest and Bridger-Teton National Forest.

With the introduction of the Scouts BSA program on February 1, 2019, unit elections are now permitted in Scouts BSA, Venturing and Sea Scouting units.

Membership

More than 160,000 youth and adults are members of the Order of the Arrow. Unit elections of the OA are allowed in Scouts BSA, Venturing, and Sea Scout units. To be eligible for induction, a youth must have spent at least 15 days and nights camping within the last two years including one long-term camp consisting of at least five consecutive nights, be under the age of 21, hold the Scouts BSA First Class rank, the Venturing Discovery Award, or the Sea Scout Ordinary rank or higher, be approved by their unit leader and be elected by the youth members of their unit.

Adults age 21 or older may be nominated after meeting the camping requirements and being approved by the lodge adult selection committee.

Honorary membership was once bestowed in special circumstances, as with Franklin D. Roosevelt and Dwight D. Eisenhower, but this practice was officially discontinued in 1953.

Ordeal
After being elected or nominated, candidates may participate in a call-out ceremony to recognize those Scouts and Scouters that were selected before they attend their Ordeal. The call-out ceremony may be performed at summer camp, a camporee, a call-out weekend or at a unit meeting. Candidates subsequently participate in an Ordeal, intended to emphasize service and selflessness. During the induction, "candidates maintain complete silence, receive small amounts of food, work on camp improvement projects, and are required to sleep alone, apart from other campers, which teaches significant values." If they succeed in their ordeal the candidates are then welcomed as Ordeal members in a formal Ordeal Ceremony.

Brotherhood
Ordeal members are entitled to all the same rights and privileges of membership in the Order as Brotherhood and Vigil Honor members—there are no ranks within the Order. However, moving on to Brotherhood membership offers an opportunity to reaffirm one's commitment to the Order. Arrowmen may "seal" their membership after six months by demonstrating their knowledge of the traditions and obligations of the OA. They then participate in an induction ceremony and become Brotherhood members.

While the Ordeal consists primarily of physical impressions, "the Brotherhood ceremony is one of the deeper and quieter mental impressions."

Vigil Honor
The Vigil Honor is a recognition given to Arrowmen for distinguished contributions beyond the immediate responsibilities of their position or office to their lodge, the Order of the Arrow, Scouting, or their Scout Camp. The Vigil Honor may be conferred upon Arrowmen who have completed a minimum of two years as a Brotherhood member and have performed exceptional service above and beyond their immediate responsibilities through leadership, exemplary efforts, and dedication. However, under no circumstances should tenure in Scouting or the Order of the Arrow be considered as reason enough for a Vigil Honor recommendation. Selection is annual and is limited to one person for every 50 members of the lodge, and members of the Order can be inducted into the Vigil Honor only with the written approval of the National Order of the Arrow Committee.

As a part of the Vigil Honor induction, each new Vigil Honor member is given a Vigil Honor name in the language of the Lenni Lenape or the language of their local Lodge. An English translation of the Vigil Honor name is also provided, and the name often represents a characteristic of the individual.

Organization

The Order of the Arrow places great emphasis on being a youth-led organization. Only youth under the age 21 are voting members and are eligible to hold elected offices. Professional and volunteer adults are appointed to non-voting advisory positions at the chapter, lodge, and section levels.

The smallest level of organization in the Order of the Arrow is the chapter. The chapter is usually corresponding to a district in the local council. The chapter is led by the elected youth chapter chief, chapter vice chiefs, secretary, and a volunteer adult is appointed as the adviser, the district executive is the professional (staff) adviser. The chapters often hold monthly or weekly meetings together. The next largest unit of the OA is the lodge, which is chartered by a local BSA council. The lodge chief is the elected youth leader, the lodge adviser is a BSA adult volunteer appointed by the Scout Executive, and the lodge staff adviser is the council Scout executive or his designated council professional Scouter. The lodge youth officers, consisting of the lodge chief, one or more vice chiefs, a secretary, and a treasurer are responsible for organizing and leading the various programs and activities of the lodge. Many lodges have standing committees responsible for ceremonies, service projects, publications, unit elections, camp promotions, and dance teams composed of youth members.

Lodges are grouped into sections that are then grouped into regions. The section chief is the elected youth leader, a volunteer adult is appointed as the section adviser, and the area director (or his designate) is the professional (staff) adviser. In addition to the section chief, the section has two additional elected officers. The vice chief and secretary are elected immediately following the election of the section chief at the section's annual business meeting. All sections gather annually at a section conclave held in the late spring or early fall. It is the main duty of the section officers to lead the planning of this weekend with the help of the lodge chiefs in the section.

Like the Boy Scouts of America's Areas, The Order of the Arrow was formerly organized into four regions, Central, Southern, Northeast and Western Region; the boundaries of each OA region correspond with the boundaries of the BSA's regions. As of 2021, following the Boy Scouts of America's restructuring of these areas, the OA changed their region boundaries, now having only two. Each region has an elected region chief, a volunteer adult who is appointed as the region chairman to oversee its region Committee, and an appointed professional (staff) adviser, forming a 'Key Three' much like the Lodge and chapter system described above. Each region chief is elected at the national planning meeting the day after the election of the national chief and vice chief by a caucus of the section chiefs from the given region. The members of the region committee consist of the region chief, the region chair, all national committee members from the region, and other appointed adult volunteers. Each region annually has a gathering of all section officers and advisers. As a region, they are trained in topics relevant to their jobs. Each region also provides opportunities for Order of the Arrow members to go through a National Leadership Seminar. This weekend course is highly rated and a lasting memory for many members.

The national chief and the national vice chief are selected by a caucus of the section chiefs at the outset of the Order of the Arrow's national planning meeting. At the national level, the OA is headed by the National Order of the Arrow committee of which the national chief and national vice chief are voting members.The national adult leadership includes the volunteer national chairman and the OA director, a professional Scouter.

Symbols

OA membership and Lodge affiliation are indicated by the wearing of the lodge emblem (commonly known as a lodge flap), an embroidered patch is worn on the right pocket flap of the uniform shirt. Each lodge flap has a unique design, generally reflecting the name, geography or history of the lodge. Part of this is a totem that represents the lodge. Special issues of flaps may be created to commemorate anniversaries and other events and are a popular item for those who engage in Scouting memorabilia collecting. At formal events or Order of the Arrow functions, Arrowmen can be readily identified by a white sash bearing a red arrow that is worn over their right shoulder. An Ordeal member wears a sash with a lone arrow. The Brotherhood member wears a sash bearing an arrow with a red bar at each end of the arrow. A Vigil Honor member wears a sash with the same bars of as the Brotherhood sash at each end of the arrow, and a Vigil Honor triangle on the center of the shaft. The OA sash is not worn at the same time as the merit badge sash, nor worn folded in the belt. The sash as a form of recognition dates to the founding of the Order and has a long history of changes in usage and design.

Arrowmen also exchange a special handshake as a token of brotherhood, along with other signs and passwords. A signature acronym, WWW (Wimachtendienk Wingolauchsik Witahemui – Brotherhood of Cheerful Service), is often depicted in publications, regalia, etc.

Additionally, Order members may choose to wear the OA Universal Ribbon suspended from the right uniform shirt pocket button.

Ceremonies

Order of the Arrow ceremonies were once considered to be secret, and consequently, the OA has been viewed by some as a secret society. With the introduction of Youth Protection program guidelines in 1980s, the BSA has made clear that any concerned parent, guardian, or religious leader may view a video of the ceremonies, attend meetings, or read ceremonial texts upon request to a council, district, lodge, or chapter official to assure themselves that there is nothing objectionable. Such persons are asked to safeguard (conceal) the details relating to ceremonies for the sake of the participants. The intent of the provision for parents and religious leaders to be allowed access to ceremonies is to ensure that there is no religious conflict or violations of youth protection guidelines occurring. Parents have long been discouraged in many Lodges from seizing the opportunity to use the provision for photo opportunities with their sons, and some lodges have instituted bans on photography during the ceremonies. Hazing or demeaning initiation pranks are also prohibited by the OA and the BSA.

The ceremonies utilize symbolic settings, rites, and principles to convey various Scouting ideals to participants. "The values of the Order of the Arrow, 'a brotherhood of cheerful service,' were passed on during a night-time ceremony: an arrowhead outlined with stones on the ground, candles on the stones, a huge bonfire at the base of the arrowhead, and at the point of the arrow a lectern from which was read, and danced, the story of heroic sacrifice for others." Ceremonies also utilize the OA song, commonly referred to by its first line of lyrics as "Firm Bound in Brotherhood", and titled "Order of the Arrow Official Song" and "The Order of the Arrow Song" in the printed music score of official OA publications. It was written in 1921 by OA founder E. Urner Goodman to the Russian hymn tune "God Save the Tsar!", composed by Alexei Lvov in the 19th century.

Awards

Awards are separate and distinct from the membership levels of Ordeal and Brotherhood. Awards available through the Order of the Arrow include: Vigil Honor, Founder's Award, Distinguished Service Award, Lifetime Achievement Award, Red Arrow Award, E. Urner Goodman Camping Award.

Events
The national OA committee also sponsors various national service opportunities, the oldest of which is the National OA Service Corps at the national Scout jamborees, at which Arrowmen have helped with many functions including shows and the Outdoor Adventure Program exhibit.

High Adventure Program

The Order of the Arrow, in its focus on service and humility, sponsors service groups to the four National High Adventure Bases that focus on conservation. Inspired by three gentlemen, Edward Pease, Eugene "Gene" Schnell and Marty Tschetter who gathered at a leadership summit at Philmont Scout Ranch in 1979, the Order of the Arrow High Adventure program was established. Originally starting with the Order of the Arrow Trail Crew at the Philmont Scout Ranch working to build new trails and repair old ones. This expanded to the Northern Tier National High Adventure Bases with the OA Wilderness Voyage, repairing the portage trails in the Boundary Waters Canoe Area, and then to Florida National High Adventure Sea Base in 2005 with Ocean Adventure, which works to remove invasive species on some of the Keys and promoting and carrying out of the Bleach watch program in the Florida Keys. After the addition of the third High Adventure Base, the Order of the Arrow implemented the OA Triple Crown Award in the summer of 2009, the OA began the OA Canadian Odyssey program which provided service similar to the OA Wilderness Voyage to the Quetico Provincial Park. In 2014, The Summit Bechtel Family National Scout Reserve began hosting the Order of the Arrow Summit Experience which gives service to the New River Gorge National River.

National Order of the Arrow Conference

The National Order of the Arrow Conference (NOAC) is a multi-day event which usually takes place on a university campus, bringing together thousands of delegates from OA lodges around the nation for training and activities. NOACs are held every two years, with exceptions made to align the event with significant anniversaries. As a youth-led organization, these national conferences are organized and directed by the elected section and region youth officers, who serve on committees responsible for various conference aspects under the leadership of the conference vice-chief. Events include training for programs, leadership and American Indian culture; competitions in athletics, ceremonies, cooking and American Indian dances; and exhibits on OA history, outdoor activities, and camping. There are also opportunities to talk with national leaders, perform service work and trade patches. Evening shows have different themes, including American Indian culture and recognition of dance competition winners, presentations of awards including the OA Distinguished Service Award and other entertainment.

Training
In addition to training courses available at a NOAC or section conclave, the OA offers specialized leadership training as weekend events for members: Lodge Leadership Development (LLD), National Leadership Seminars (NLS), and National Lodge Adviser Training Seminar (NLATS). LLD is a one-day or two-day event conducted by a lodge to train their officers and advisers. NLS's are conducted by regions for lodge officers and advisers. Many lodges send key officers to receive training. Typically, each region schedules three or four NLS weekends annually, at geographically dispersed locations within the region. NLATS is a training event for adults, usually held in conjunction with an NLS and conducted by regions, on the role of advisers in the OA.

Largely considered the adult equivalent of the NLS program, NLATS's primary objective was to provide advanced training to adults in each lodge. NLATS and NLS usually happened concurrently on the same weekend. The events were planned and executed by a staff of adults. After successful pilots in 2016, the Developing Youth Leadership Conference curriculum began replacing NLATS in early 2017.

Association with Native American Cultures
Goodman and Edson, the founders of the Order of the Arrow, opted to portray what they saw as Native American characteristics "as a sign of scouting excellence," and that the imagery, costuming, titles and imitation rituals "evoked a primitivist exterior Indian Other, vanished from the modern world but still accessible through ritual and its accompanying objects."

Goodman and Edson established the OA at Treasure Island Scout Reservation as a Scouting honor society "based on a loose interpretation of" Hiawatha and the novel The Last of the Mohicans. Inductions of new OA members at Treasure Island involved OA members meeting around bonfires in "ritual Indian costume".

In the past, members of the OA have used face paint, performed dances with religious significance, and used terms now considered objectionable in reference to Native Americans. The OA officially no longer allows these practices, stating that this is in recognition of preferences of Native American groups that found such actions offensive.

The Chief Seattle Council of the BSA has written that modern ceremonies conducted by each OA lodge are "influenced by" the history and traditions of the Native American tribes indigenous to the areas the lodge serves. A 2003 Ceremonial Team Training guide of the Shawnee Lodge of the OA advised Arrowmen that among the factors to be considered pertaining to the outfits they design to wear in their rituals, "The first and foremost is respect for Native Americans, especially those whose tribal style you are emulating."

According to the Indian Affairs team of the Atta Kulla Kulla Lodge:

On July 23, 2018 the National Order of the Arrow Committee announced that they had received "many complaints surrounding these ceremonies from various American Indian tribes due to the manner in which they are conducted as well as the inconsistent nature in which they are performed." and that effective as of January 1, 2019, "lodges and chapters that are asked to conduct Arrow of Light or crossover ceremonies for Cub Scout packs will only be permitted to conduct them using the new approved official ceremonies which can be found in the OA Inductions Portal. These ceremonies are to be conducted in a Scout uniform and are no longer permitted to be done in American Indian regalia."

Controversies

The Order of the Arrow has been protested and criticized for engaging in cultural appropriation and spreading stereotypes of, and racism against, Native Americans. Protester concerns include OA's imitation of Native American ceremonies, regalia, and artwork they consider to be offensive.

In 2015, OA member Philip Rice wrote a letter to The State News of Michigan State University to protest hosting the National Order of the Arrow Conference on the MSU campus. He felt the OA's former logo, "a stylized image of a generic 'native' face with a swirling headdress" was offensive, but better than Central Michigan University's defunct "Chippewa" logo and the Washington Redskins logo. He also objected to a prominent image of the original chief bonnet worn by a young white man on the OA's website. He acknowledged the recent changes toward social awareness such as changing the logo to a rough-hewn arrowhead, but concluded that the OA "remains guilty of flagrant cultural appropriation and borderline racism".

Use of Native American sacred objects by non-Native groups such as the Boy Scouts has been condemned by Native activists. Mother of former scouts, Ozheebeegay Ikwe, writes, "While native children in residential schools had their culture and language beaten from them, the Boy Scouts were using the language and their version of “Indian culture” in their OA ceremony." She stresses that the proper use of "the Drum, Pipe, and Eagle Feather", along with other sacred ways, is a great responsibility in Native American cultures, that "traditional ways are not a costume", and that these sacred ways are still part of the lives of Native American people who want them preserved intact for their own children, rather than used by "just anyone." She called the OA's use of headdresses, face paint, eagle feathers, and dancing with a pipe, "downright offensive". After researching the OA and watching their ceremonies she said, "Use of these items by Boy Scouts indicates that there is very little understanding of the Native people they claim to admire and respect."

David Prochaska, professor in the University of Illinois History Department states the Order of the Arrow is one element that "exemplifies the much larger phenomenon of 'playing Indian'...Boy Scouts, Eagle Scouts, Order of the Arrow. Order of Red Men. Campfire Girls. Woodcraft. Boston Tea Party. 'White Indians' – white New Agers as Native American 'wannabes.' ... To pursue the argument a step further, what is 'playing Indian,' 'playing Native,' 'playing an Other,' all about? It is about play, for one thing, in the sense of dressing up, masquerade, the Bakhtinian carnivalesque...It is also about appropriation, in the sense of taking on, assuming an other's identity, taking another's identity. The implication here is replacing one with another, silencing another, speaking for another."

Elections to the Order of the Arrow have likewise sparked controversy as being little more than popularity contests, especially in troops where scouts attend the same schools and are friends outside of the troop.  As such, deserving scouts, who are not popular among their troop mates, frequently remain excluded from the Order of the Arrow.  In larger troops, the election of younger scouts almost never occurs since older scouts dominate the troop leadership and will frequently only elect their peers rather than scouts who are several years younger.  The Chairman of the Order of the Arrow acknowledged in 2011 that elections were a challenge, and that steps had been taken for adult leaders to make a greater effort to convey the serious nature of Order of the Arrow membership to members of the troop.

References

External links
 The Internet Guide to OA Insignia

 
Boy Scouts of America
Youth organizations established in 1915
Honor societies